Ajay Muhammad Priatna (born 18 December 1966) is the 3rd Mayor of Cimahi who took office from 22 October 2017 to 28 November 2020. Before entering politics, he was a businessman.

Ajay M. Priatna was found guilty of committing a criminal act of corruption, in the form of receiving gratuities, in the construction of a hospital. He was sentenced to 2 years in prison. Ajay was also fined IDR 100 million, a subsidiary of 3 months in prison.

On 27 November 2020, Ajay was caught in a red-handed operation by the Corruption Eradication Commission (KPK) on suspicion of bribery.

Political career 
Chief of Indonesian Democratic Party of Struggle (PDI-P) Cimahi City Regional Branch. (until 2020 (dishonorably discharged)

References 

Living people
People from Cimahi
Indonesian politicians convicted of corruption
1966 births